Native Americans in the American Civil War refers to the involvement of various tribes of Native Americans in the United States during the American Civil War.

These include:

Catawba in the American Civil War
Cherokee in the American Civil War
Choctaw in the American Civil War
Seminole in the American Civil War

See also
Indian Territory in the American Civil War